Marcha (born 1956) is a Dutch singer and television presenter.

Marcha may also refer to:

Marcha (newspaper), a former Uruguayan weekly
La Movida Madrileña, a Spanish countercultural movement

See also
 March (disambiguation)
 Marche (disambiguation)